The Mirach 26 is a reconnaissance UAV developed in Italy during the 1990s, based on the Mirach 20 target drone. The initial work on the design was carried out by Meteor CAE before this company was absorbed by Galileo Avionica, than Selex ES (merged into Leonardo-Finmeccanica since 2016).

The Mirach 26 is of typical twin-boom pusher-prop battlefield surveillance UAV configuration. It is very similar to the older Mirach 20 in appearance but slightly bigger, the most visible difference being that the Mirach 26 has antenna disks on the top of the tailfins. It is powered by a 20 kW (26 hp) Sachs piston engine.

Specifications

References
This article contains material that originally came from the web article Unmanned Aerial Vehicles by Greg Goebel, which exists in the Public Domain.

 Jane's Unmanned Aerial Vehicles and Targets
 MIRACH 100/5 on Leonardocompany.com

1990s Italian military reconnaissance aircraft
Unmanned aerial vehicles of Italy
Mirach 26
Single-engined pusher aircraft
Twin-boom aircraft